A tactical formation (or order) is the arrangement or deployment of moving military forces such as infantry, cavalry, AFVs, military aircraft, or naval vessels. Formations were found in tribal societies such as the pua rere of the Māori, and ancient or medieval formations which include shield walls (skjaldborg in Old Norse), phalanxes (lines of battle in close order), testudo formation and skirmishers. 
Tactical formations include:

 Flight Formations
 Box
 Coil: Similar to the Herringbone formation, the coil formation allows for 360 degree security while at the halt. This type of formation is also used when refueling aircraft as well as during resupply. Sometimes platoon leaders also use it when briefing to platoon sergeants. Air guards and dismounted fire teams are also in position while this formation is being used.
 Column
 Echelon
 Herringbone
 Line
 Skirmish 
 Square
 Staggered column 
 V formation
 Vanguard
 Wedge and inverted wedge
 File: The file formation is used in elements of up to a platoon size. A file formation is used for close terrain, often in dense vegetation or when there is low visibility. The file formation is easiest to control, and provides fire to the ranks should an ambush from the side occur.
 Diamond: Similar to the Wedge and inverted wedge, the diamond formation allows for the fourth section to follow the lead element. The advantages to this formation include having the ability to control elements even in a tight terrain, and allows for quick maneuverability to assign squads as the assaulting element, and assign certain squads to support-by-fire.

See also
 Close order formation
 Division (military)
 Formation flying
 Laager
 Military organization
 Night attack formation

References

Sources
 Journal of the Polynesian Society, Vols. 1-19, 1892–1910

Military doctrines